Moechotypa umbrosa is a species of beetle in the family Cerambycidae. It was described by Lacordaire in 1872. It is known from Myanmar, Laos, and Thailand.

References

umbrosa
Beetles described in 1872